Bell railway station is located on the Main Western line in New South Wales, Australia. It serves the Blue Mountains village of Bell, and opened in May 1875 as Mount Wilson, being renamed Bell on 1 May 1889. Situated 1,069 metres above sea level, it is the station with the highest elevation on the NSW TrainLink network. From December 2019 to May 2020, the station was closed due to major bushfire damage on the line.

Platforms & services
Bell has one island platform with two sides. It is served by NSW TrainLink Blue Mountains Line trains travelling from Sydney Central to Lithgow. It is a request stop with passengers having to notify the guard if they wish to alight, and signal the driver if they want to board.

References

External links

Bell station details Transport for New South Wales

Railway stations in Australia opened in 1875
Regional railway stations in New South Wales
Short-platform railway stations in New South Wales, 4 cars
Main Western railway line, New South Wales